Francesco Mauriello (born 28 November 1993) is an Italian motorcycle racer. He won the Italian 125 GP championship in 2010.

Career statistics

Grand Prix motorcycle racing

By season

Races by year
(key) (Races in bold indicate pole position, races in italics indicate fastest lap)

References

External links
 Profile on MotoGP.com

Italian motorcycle racers
Living people
1993 births
125cc World Championship riders
Sportspeople from the Province of Naples